Ya'qub ibn Ishaq al-Israili (died 1208 CE) was a 12th-century Egyptian Jewish physician.

Works
 "Treatise of the Errors of the Physicians in Damascus": on the improper medical care he observed during a visit to Damascus.

In addition, Ibn Abi Usaibia recorded that Ya'qub wrote the following works:

 "Maḳalah fi Kawanîn Ṭabiyah" (Treatise on the Canons of Medicine)
 "Kitab al-Nazh" (Book of Pleasure)
 "Kitab fi Mizaj Dimashka" (Book Containing Three Treatises)
 "Masail Ṭabiyah" (Questions of Medicine)

References 

1208 deaths
Medieval Jewish physicians of Egypt
12th-century Egyptian physicians
12th-century Jews
Year of birth unknown
Physicians from the Ayyubid Sultanate